Camille Cabral (born 31 May 1944) is a French-Brazilian politician and dermatologist. The first trans woman to be elected in the history of the French Republic (she was on the council of the 17th arrondissement of Paris with the French Green Party), she is also the founder of the non-governmental organisation PASTT – Prévention, Action, Santé, Travail pour les Transgenres (Prevention, Action, Health and Work for transgender community).

See also 
 Marie Cau, first openly trans woman elected mayor in France

References

External links 
PASTT official site

1944 births
Living people
The Greens (France) politicians
Transgender politicians
Transgender women
French transgender people
French LGBT politicians
Brazilian LGBT rights activists
French people of Brazilian descent
21st-century French LGBT people